Kevin "Slith" McGuckin (born 21 February 1981) is a Gaelic footballer who plays for the Derry county team, with whom he has won a National League title. McGuckin was captain of the Derry team for 2007 and is currently the vice-captain. He is regarded as one of the best defenders in Ireland.

McGuckin plays his club football for Ballinderry Shamrocks. He was part of the Ballinderry team that won the 2002 All-Ireland Senior Club Football Championship, and he has also won four Derry Championships and an Ulster Senior Club Football Championship with the club.

Playing career

Inter-county

McGuckin made his Championship debut against Donegal in the 2002 Ulster Championship semi-final. He was named Derry captain for 2007, but missed most of the season after breaking his leg in a National League against Louth in April of that year. He returned to come on as a substitute against Laois and started against Dublin in the All-Ireland quarter-final.

He was instrumental in the 2008 National League, which Derry won, defeating Kerry in the final. McGuckin and Derry also reached the National League final in 2009, but were defeated by Kerry.

Club
McGuckin lead Ballinderry Shamrocks to victory in October 2011 when he captained the side to their 11th County Derry title.

McGuckin won his first Derry Senior Football Championship in 2001 and Ballinderry went on to win that year's Ulster Senior Club Football Championship, and the All-Ireland Senior Club Football Championship the following March. He has won further Derry Championship medals with the club in 2002, 2006, 2008 and 2012.

Province
McGuckin has been selected to play for Ulster and won a Railway Cup medal with the province in 2004. He was also part of the team that finished runners-up to Leinster in the 2005 Railway Cup final.

Honours

Inter-county
National Football League:
Winner (1): 2008
Runner up: 2009
Dr McKenna Cup:
Runner up: 2005, 2008, 2011
Ulster Senior Football Championship Winner (0)
Runner Up (1) 2011

ClubAll-Ireland Senior Club Football Championship:Winner (1): 2002All-Ireland Kilmacud Crokes Sevens Championship:Winner (1): 1998??
Runner up: 1999??Ulster Senior Club Football Championship:Winner (1): 2001
Runner up: 2006, 2008Ulster Senior Club Football League:Winner (1): 2008Derry Senior Football Championship:Winner (6): 2001, 2002, 2006, 2008, 2011 (c), 2012
Runner up: 1999??, 2000, 2003Derry Senior Football League:Winner (4): 2005, 2006, 2007, 2008, 2011 C
Numerous underage competitions

ProvinceRailway Cup:Winner (1):'''' 2004
Runner up: 2005

Individual
Derry Senior football captain: 2007

Note: The above lists may be incomplete. Please add any other honours you know of.

References

External links

Interview with Ulster Bank
Meet the players - Laid-back interview with BBC Online
Player profiles on Official Derry GAA website

Living people
1981 births
Ballinderry Gaelic footballers
Derry inter-county Gaelic footballers
Ulster inter-provincial Gaelic footballers